Troutville may refer to: 
 Troutville, Virginia
 Troutville, Pennsylvania